Liaquat Gymnasium is an indoor sporting arena located in Islamabad, Pakistan.  The capacity of the arena is 10,223 spectators. It hosts indoor sporting events such as Basketball, Badminton, Boxing and Pro Wrestling. Earthquake preventing technology was used in Liaquat Gymnasium's construction. On 27 November,1986 the 6th PTV Awards show was also held in this complex.

Exhibitions
 PTV Awards

References

Basketball venues in Pakistan
Boxing venues in Pakistan
Indoor arenas in Pakistan
Sport in Islamabad